Phosphatidylserine synthase 1 is a protein that in humans is encoded by the PTDSS1 gene.

Function

The protein encoded by this gene catalyzes the formation of phosphatidylserine from either phosphatidylcholine or phosphatidylethanolamine. Phosphatidylserine synthase localizes to the mitochondria-associated membrane of the endoplasmic reticulum, where it serves a structural role as well as a signaling role. Defects in this gene are a cause of Lenz-Majewski hyperostotic dwarfism. Two transcript variants encoding different isoforms have been found for this gene. [provided by RefSeq, Mar 2014].

References

Further reading